Top Chef: All-Stars L.A. is the seventeenth season of the American reality television series Top Chef. The season was first announced on November 16, 2019, during a Top Chef-themed panel at Bravo's inaugural fan convention, BravoCon. The competition was filmed in Los Angeles, California, the same setting as the second season. The season finale took place in Italy, marking the first time the show has traveled to Europe. As with the previous all-stars edition, the cast of All-Stars L.A. was composed entirely of returning contestants. Padma Lakshmi and Tom Colicchio returned to judge, along with Gail Simmons, following her absence from the previous season. Along with the return of Last Chance Kitchen, a new web series titled What Would Tom Do? debuted, showcasing Colicchio's approach to the contestants' various challenges. The winner received . 

The season premiered on March 19, 2020, and concluded on June 18, 2020. In the season finale, Top Chef: Boston finalist Melissa King was declared the winner over Top Chef: Las Vegas and Top Chef Masters runner-up Bryan Voltaggio, and Top Chef: Seattle and Top Chef: New Orleans contestant Stephanie Cmar. King was also voted Fan Favorite.

Contestants
Fifteen past Top Chef contestants were selected to compete in Top Chef: All-Stars L.A.

Contestant progress

: The chef(s) did not receive immunity for winning the Quickfire Challenge.
: Melissa received immunity for selling the most products during the Elimination Challenge.
: Following Episode 6 of Last Chance Kitchen, Karen returned to the competition.
: Kevin won Last Chance Kitchen and returned to the competition.
 (WINNER) The chef won the season and was crowned "Top Chef".
 (RUNNER-UP) The chef was a runner-up for the season.
 (WIN) The chef won the Elimination Challenge.
 (HIGH) The chef was selected as one of the top entries in the Elimination Challenge, but did not win.
 (IN) The chef was not selected as one of the top or bottom entries in the Elimination Challenge and was safe.
 (LOW) The chef was selected as one of the bottom entries in the Elimination Challenge, but was not eliminated.
 (OUT) The chef lost the Elimination Challenge.

Episodes

Last Chance Kitchen

References
Notes

Footnotes

External links
 Official website

Top Chef
2020 American television seasons
Television shows set in Los Angeles
Television shows filmed in California
Television shows filmed in Italy